Faridkot State  was a self-governing princely state outside British India during the British Raj period in the Indian sub-continent until Indian independence. It was founded by Sidhu-Brar Jats.

Faridkot was one of the Cis-Sutlej states, which came under British influence in 1809. It was bounded on the west and northeast by the British district of Ferozepore, and on the south by Nabha State. During the First Anglo-Sikh War in 1845 the chief, Raja Pahar Singh, was allied with the British, and was rewarded with an increase of territory. In the Indian Rebellion of 1857, too, his son and successor, Wazir Singh, guarded the Sutlej ferries, and destroyed a rebel stronghold.

Demographics

Religion

See also 

 Phulkian sardars
 Patiala State
 Nabha State
 Jind State
 Malaudh
 Bhadaur
 Kaithal
 Cis-Sutlej states

Notes

References

Princely states of Punjab
Patiala
History of Punjab, India
1803 establishments in India
1947 disestablishments in India